Excavation is the second studio album by The Haxan Cloak, released on Tri Angle Records on April 16, 2013.

Reception

Excavation received acclaim from music critics. At Metacritic, which assigns a normalized rating out of 100 to reviews from mainstream critics, the album received an average score of 84 based on 16 reviews, indicating "universal acclaim". Pitchfork named Excavation the 29th best album of 2013, and Rolling Stone called it the 16th best dance album of 2013.

Track listing

Personnel
 Music: Bobby Krlic
 Design: DR.ME
 Mastered by: Matt Colton
 Mastered at: Alchemy Mastering
 Photography: Cody Cobb

References

2013 albums
The Haxan Cloak albums
Instrumental albums